Cameo-Kid was a United States-based record label in the 1920s. 

Cameo-Kid was a subsidiary of Cameo Records, marketing recordings intended for children. Cameo-Kid used professional artists with known names in their recordings, including star Vaudeville singers and noted dance-band musicians. This was unlike some other early Children's records labels, which tended to feature recordings by unnamed and undistinguished talent. Cameo-Kid artists probably recorded these discs while in the Cameo studios for recording more mainstream records.

Cameo-Kid Records are double-sided 7-inch gramophone records.

See also
 List of record labels

Defunct record labels of the United States